Dimpal Kumari Jha (Nepali: डिम्पल कुमारी झा; 12 July 1979 – 24 April 2022) was a Nepalese politician, member of the Provincial Assembly of Province No. 2. She was State Minister of Physical Infrastructure Development in the Government of Province No. 2. She was nominated as a Proportional representation member to participate in the Provincial Assembly of Province No. 2 from political party Rastriya Janata Party Nepal.

She also served as a member of the 2013 Nepalese Constituent Assembly. Jha was also an Ayurvedic Doctor.

Early life
Dimpal Kumari Jha was born on 12 July 1979 to Sudarshan Pathak and Shrimati Shova Pathak. Her husband Anil Kumar Jha is a member of Federal Parliament of Nepal and prominent leader of RJPN, Nepal.

Province-level politics

She was a member of the Provincial Assembly of Province No. 2. She was a State Minister of Physical Infrastructure Development in the Government of Province No. 2.

References

External links

1979 births
2022 deaths 
Deaths from colorectal cancer
21st-century Nepalese women politicians
21st-century Nepalese politicians
Nepalese Hindus
People from Parsa District
Provincial cabinet ministers of Nepal
Members of the Provincial Assembly of Madhesh Province
Members of the 2nd Nepalese Constituent Assembly
Rastriya Janata Party Nepal politicians
Nepal Sadbhawana Party politicians
People's Socialist Party, Nepal politicians
Loktantrik Samajwadi Party, Nepal politicians